Jhummandi Naadam is a 2010 Indian Telugu-language musical drama film produced by Lakshmi Manchu and directed by K. Raghavendra Rao. The film stars Manoj Manchu and debutant Taapsee Pannu and Mohan Babu in a supporting role. The film has music scored by M.M. Keeravani. The film was released on 1 July 2010. This film is debut of the actress Taapsee Pannu in Indian film industry.

Plot
Balu (Manoj Manchu) has only one goal in his life - to become a great playback singer like SP Balasubramanyam. He challenges a landlord in his village and comes to Hyderabad to become a singer. Captain Rao (Mohan Babu) stays in the opposite house. He is an old-fashioned man who hates the lifestyle of new generation. Sravya (Taapsee Pannu) is an NRI girl who stays in her father's friend Captain Rao's house. She is in India to do documentary on traditional Telugu music. Balu acts ae to her and in the process, they fall in love. Captain Rao doesn't like them falling in love with each other. The rest of the story is all about Captain Rao's restrictions and how the lovers emerge unscathed.

Cast
 Manoj Manchu as Balu/Hari 
 Taapsee Pannu as Sravya
 Mohan Babu as Captain Rao
 Suman as Sravya's Father
 Brahmanandam as Brahmi
 MS Narayana
 Ali
 Dharmavarapu Subramanyam
 Ahuti Prasad
 Tanikella Bharani as Balu's father 
 Sudha
 Aishwarya
 Pragathi
 Vithika Sheru

Soundtrack

The soundtrack of the film was released worldwide on 28 May 2010 . It had music scored by composer M. M. Keeravani. S.P.Balasubramanyam sang 5 songs after a long time.

References

External links
 https://web.archive.org/web/20100606035201/http://www.idlebrain.com/audio/areviews/vedam-jhummandinaadam.html
 http://www.idlebrain.com/movie/archive/mr-jhummandinaadam.html
 http://www.idlebrain.com/celeb/interview/lakshmimanchu1.html
 

2010 films
Films directed by K. Raghavendra Rao
Films scored by M. M. Keeravani
2010s Telugu-language films